In differential geometry, Mikhail Gromov's filling area conjecture asserts that the hemisphere has minimum area among the orientable surfaces that fill a closed curve of given length without introducing shortcuts between its points.

Definitions and statement of the conjecture 

A compact surface  fills a closed curve  if its border (also called boundary, denoted ) is the curve . The filling  is said to be isometric if for any two points  of the boundary curve , the distance  between them along  is the same (not less) than the distance  along the boundary. In other words, to fill a curve isometrically is to fill it without introducing shortcuts.

Question: How small can be the area of a surface that isometrically fills its boundary curve, of given length?

For example, in three-dimensional Euclidean space, the circle

(of length 2) is filled by the flat disk

which is not an isometric filling, because any straight chord along it is a shortcut. In contrast, the hemisphere

is an isometric filling of the same circle , which has twice the area of the flat disk. Is this the minimum possible area?

The surface can be imagined as made of a flexible but non-stretchable material, that allows it to be moved around and bended in Euclidean space. None of these transformations modifies the area of the surface nor the length of the curves drawn on it, which are the magnitudes relevant to the problem. The surface can be removed from Euclidean space altogether, obtaining a Riemannian surface, which is an abstract smooth surface with a Riemannian metric that encodes the lengths and area. Reciprocally, according to the Nash-Kuiper theorem, any Riemannian surface with boundary can be embedded in Euclidean space preserving the lengths and area specified by the Riemannian metric. Thus the filling problem can be stated equivalently as a question about Riemannian surfaces, that are not placed in Euclidean space in any particular way.

Conjecture (Gromov's filling area conjecture, 1983): The hemisphere has minimum area among the orientable compact Riemannian surfaces that fill isometrically their boundary curve, of given length.

Gromov's proof for the case of Riemannian disks 

In the same paper where Gromov stated the conjecture, he proved that

the hemisphere has least area among the Riemannian surfaces that isometrically fill a circle of given length, and are homeomorphic to a disk.

Proof: Let  be a Riemannian disk that isometrically fills its boundary of length . (And reciprocally, if we cut open a projective plane along a shortest noncontractible loop of length , we obtain a disk that fills isometrically its boundary of length .) Thus the minimum area that the isometric filling  can have is equal to the minimum area that a Riemannian projective plane of systole  can have. But then Pu's systolic inequality asserts precisely that a Riemannian projective plane of given systole has minimum area if and only if it is round (that is, obtained from a Euclidean sphere by identifying each point with its opposite). The area of this round projective plane equals the area of the hemisphere (because each of them has half the area of the sphere).

The proof of Pu's inequality relies, in turn, on the uniformization theorem.

Fillings with Finsler metrics 

In 2001, Sergei Ivanov presented another way to prove that the hemisphere has smallest area among isometric fillings homeomorphic to a disk. His argument does not employ the uniformization theorem and is based instead on the topological fact that two curves on a disk must cross if their four endpoints are on the boundary and interlaced. Moreover, Ivanov's proof applies more generally to disks with Finsler metrics, which differ from Riemannian metrics in that they need not satisfy the Pythagorean equation at the infinitesimal level. The area of a Finsler surface can be defined in various inequivalent ways, and the one employed here is the Holmes–Thompson area, which coincides with the usual area when the metric is Riemannian. What Ivanov proved is that

The hemisphere has minimum Holmes–Thompson area among Finsler disks that isometrically fill a closed curve of given length.

Let  be a Finsler disk that isometrically fills its boundary of length . The Holmes–Thompson area of the filling can be computed by the formula

 

Choose a collection  of boundary points, listed in counterclockwise order. For each point , we define on M the scalar function . These functions have the following properties:
 Each function  is Lipschitz on M and therefore (by Rademacher's theorem) differentiable at almost every point .
The differential  has norm 1 and is the unique covector  such that .
 In each point  where all the functions  are differentiable, the covectors  are distinct and placed in counterclockwise order on the dual unit sphere . Also, if three of these covectors  (for some ) appeared in inverted order, then two of the three shortest curves from the points  to  would cross each other, which is not possible.

In summary, for almost every interior point , the covectors  are vertices, listed in counterclockwise order, of a convex polygon inscribed in the dual unit ball . Therefore we have a lower bound

for the area of the filling. If we define the 1-form , then we can rewrite this lower bound using the Stokes formula as

.

The boundary integral that appears here is defined in terms of the distance functions  restricted to the boundary, which do not depend on the isometric filling. The result of the integral therefore depends only on the placement of the points  on the circle of length 2L. We omitted the computation, and expressed the result in terms of the lengths  of each counterclockwise boundary arc from a point  to the following point . The computation is valid only if .

This implies that

,

as we had to prove.

Unlike the Riemannian case, there is a great variety of Finsler disks that isometrically fill a closed curve and have the same Holmes–Thompson area as the hemisphere. If the Hausdorff area is used instead, then the minimality of the hemisphere still holds, but the hemisphere becomes the unique minimizer. This follows from Ivanov's theorem since the Hausdorff area of a Finsler manifold is never less than the Holmes–Thompson area, and the two areas are equal if and only if the metric is Riemannian.

Non-minimality of the hemisphere among rational fillings with Finsler metrics 
A Euclidean disk that fills a circle can be replaced, without decreasing the distances between boundary points, by a Finsler disk that fills the same circle =10 times (in the sense that its boundary wraps around the circle  times), but whose Holmes–Thompson area is less than  times the area of the disk. For the hemisphere, a similar replacement can be found. In other words, the filling area conjecture is false if Finsler 2-chains with rational coefficients are allowed as fillings, instead of orientable surfaces (which can be considered as 2-chains with integer coefficients).

Riemannian fillings of genus one and hyperellipticity 

An orientable Riemannian surface of genus one that isometrically fills the circle cannot have less area than the hemisphere. The proof in this case again starts by gluing antipodal points of the boundary. The non-orientable closed surface obtained in this way has an orientable double cover of genus two, and is therefore hyperelliptic. The proof then exploits a formula by J. Hersch from integral geometry. Namely, consider the family of figure-8 loops on a football, with the self-intersection point at the equator. Hersch's formula expresses the area of a metric in the conformal class of the football, as an average of the energies of the figure-8 loops from the family.  An application of Hersch's formula to the hyperelliptic quotient of the Riemann surface proves the filling area conjecture in this case.

Almost flat manifolds are minimal fillings of their boundary distances 

This implies that if a piece of sphere is sufficiently small (and therefore, nearly flat), then it is a volume minimizer. If this theorem can be extended to large regions (namely, to the whole hemisphere), then the filling area conjecture is true. It has been conjectured that all simple Riemannian manifolds (those that are convex at their boundary, and where every two points are joined by a unique geodesic) are volume minimizers.

This implies that the replacement has not less volume than the original manifold .

See also

Filling radius
Pu's inequality
Systolic geometry

References

Conjectures
Unsolved problems in geometry
Riemannian geometry
Differential geometry
Differential geometry of surfaces
Surfaces
Area
Systolic geometry